Safiya Wazir (born 1991) is an Afghan-American community activist and politician. She served as a Democratic member of the New Hampshire House of Representatives. Wazir is the first former refugee to serve in the New Hampshire State House.

Early life and education
Wazir and her family lived in Baghlan Province in Afghanistan prior to Taliban rule. Her family left during her childhood, and they spent ten years in Uzbekistan before immigrating to Concord, New Hampshire. She knew little English upon her arrival and studied the dictionary to learn. Her family was unable to communicate in English shortly after their arrival but received assistance from a Lutheran organization and often ate only rice.

She was forced to restart her secondary school education and thus graduated from high school at age 20. She enrolled in the New Hampshire Technical Institute, where she took night classes so she could support her family. She graduated from the community college with a degree in business.

Upon her parents' insistence, she returned to Afghanistan for an arranged marriage, and together with her spouse she returned to Concord.

Career
Wazir began working within the Heights community of Concord; becoming a director of its Community Action Program and a vice-chairwoman of its Head Start Policy Council. In February 2018, Wazir's friend suggested that she run for office, although Wazir refused the request until her partner and parents agreed to support her children. In September 2018, she beat Dick Patten to win the Democratic primary for a seat in the legislature of New Hampshire. Shortly thereafter, Wazir became the first refugee to be elected to New Hampshire's state house.

The BBC listed Wazir on their list of 100 Women in 2018.

Electoral record

References 

1991 births
Living people
Activists from New Hampshire
Afghan women activists
Afghan refugees
Afghan emigrants to the United States
American politicians of Arab descent
21st-century American women politicians
21st-century American politicians
Democratic Party members of the New Hampshire House of Representatives
Asian-American people in New Hampshire politics
Women state legislators in New Hampshire
BBC 100 Women
People from Baghlan Province
Refugees in the United States
American community activists